Force Protection, Inc. was a manufacturer of ballistic- and blast-protected vehicles from the United States which have been used in Iraq, Afghanistan, Kosovo and other hot spots around the world. The company was acquired by General Dynamics in 2011.

Company
The company traces its roots to Sonic Jet Performance, Inc., a California speed boat company founded in 1997. When the boat business hit tough times after the Sept. 11, 2001 terrorist attacks, a new investor Frank Kavanaugh stepped in and looked to alter the direction of the business. Kavanaugh financed and secured the rights to a new line of products in support of the company's Mission to Protect and Save Lives. Around that time, the team identified an insolvent company in South Carolina called Technical Solutions, building a prototype of a mine-resistant vehicle called Buffalo and attempting to build a smaller vehicle called the Cougar/Tempest MRAP (Mine Resistant Ambush Protected). Technical Solutions was struggling and required a new strategy and additional resources.  The products were designed using commercial components, and utilized a strategy to allow them to be rapidly rebuilt in the field.

Kavanaugh, the company chairman and largest investor, rebranded the company Force Protection, added rapid design capability, a focus on product quality, large scale production, and technical talent including the addition Dr. Vernon Joynt an internationally recognized blast expert. Over a 3-year period, the new management team retooled the vehicles and developed the production capability of the business to almost $1.3 billion in annual sales - by integrating high quality US automotive components with an innovative and effective blast resistant chassis.

The heavily armored trucks featured a V-hull design that deflected underbody blasts away from the passenger compartment, and with Dr. Joynt's expertise the products were enhanced to address side-blast from IEDs (Improvised Explosive Devices) that had become a primary cause of injury and death for soldiers in Iraq and Afghanistan.  The base designs secured from  Mechem (South African government) resulted in two U.S. models: the Buffalo, a huge, mine-clearing truck, and the Cougar, which was smaller and more versatile, and through the company's R & D efforts with Dr. Joynt several innovations and improvements such as the Cheetah, and Spaced Armor.

Force Protection initially struggled with its first small MRAP contracts in 2002 through 2005. At first the company had less than a dozen people on its early production line. At times the prototype approach took five weeks to build one Cougar. The United States Department of Defense fined Force Protection more than $1.5 million for initial delivery delays. Kavanaugh focused on moving from a prototype production environment to sustainable volume production methods.

The team overcame these issues, developed agreements with other defense industry manufacturers such as Armor Holdings and BAE Systems, as well as a joint venture company with General Dynamics ("Force Dynamics"), to merge Force Protection's proprietary designs with the manufacturing capacity necessary to meet increasing demand. Force Protection received several contracts as part of the MRAP program, supplying blast resistant vehicles to American forces in Iraq, but with Kavanaugh's departure in 2007 the remaining team lost focus and chose not to introduce an innovative JLTV category vehicle known as Cheetah.  This led ultimately to the sale of the company to General Dynamics as orders were increasingly placed with rivals companies.

Product Line
Cheetah – Thirteen Cheetah prototypes were produced in 2005 and available in 2006 & 2007. Intended for urban operations, reconnaissance, and forward command and control, no contracts were signed for the Cheetah.
Cougar – The Cougar is a medium-sized mine-protected vehicle for command and control, artillery prime mover, recovery and ambulance duty.  The Cougar has been in service with a number of armed forces since 2002.
Cougar H 4×4 can carry 4 troops and an EOD robot.
Cougar HE 6×6 can carry up to 12 troops.
Buffalo – The Buffalo is designed principally for route clearing activities, asset protection, urban weapons systems, and command and control.  The Buffalo has been in service with a number of armed forces since 2003
SPECTRE – The SPECTRE light vehicle (formerly JAMMA) prototype. Offered to SOCOM in 2012, no contracts were signed.
Ocelot – The Ocelot, which is designed and built in the United Kingdom by Force Protection Europe, is a light protected patrol vehicle (LPPV) ordered in 2010 to replace the UK military's Snatch Land Rover .

See also 
ILAV

References

External links
General Dynamics Land Systems - Force Protection website
Yahoo! - Force Protection Inc. Company Profile
Extensive article from the USA Today about Force Protection Inc.

Companies based in South Carolina
Defense companies of the United States
Military vehicle manufacturers